Aminobacter lissarensis is a bacterium from the genus of Aminobacter which was isolated from soil of beech woodland on Northern Ireland.

References

External links
Type strain of Aminobacter lissarensis at BacDive -  the Bacterial Diversity Metadatabase

Phyllobacteriaceae
Bacteria described in 2005